Chafteh Darreh may refer to:

Chafteh Darreh-ye Olya
Chafteh Darreh-ye Sofla
Chafteh Darreh-ye Vosta